Kristofer Andreas Lange (6 September 1886 – 27 April 1977) was a Norwegian architect.

He was born in Kristiania (now Oslo), Norway. He was son of architect  Balthazar Lange (1854-1937) and  his wife, Elise Klöcker (1857-1934).
He attended the Royal Arts School (1905–09) and  Kristiania Technical School (1909). He continued his studies at   Königlich Technische Hochschule, Charlottenburg in Berlin  (1911–12). He worked as an assistant of architect Henrik Bull (1909–11) and (1912–13). He established his own practice in Kristiania during 1915.
 
He received a number of municipal government assignments and is most  associated with the regulation plan  Solgryten for the area Sogn along the Sognsvann Line in Oslo during the 1920s.

Gallery

References

1886 births
1977 deaths
Architects from Oslo
Technical University of Berlin alumni